Giovanni Dolfini (1885-1968) was an Italian stage and film actor. He also directed the 1920 silent film Dopo.

Selected filmography
 Agrippina (1911)
 The Last Adventure (1932)
 Sleeping Beauty (1942)
 A Yank in Rome (1946)
 Hotel Luna, Room 34 (1946)
 Honeymoon Deferred (1950)
 Who Is Without Sin (1952)
 The Dream of Zorro (1952)
 Torna! (1954)

References

Bibliography
 Giacomo Gambetti. Vittorio Gassmann. Gremese Editore, 1999.

External links

1885 births
1968 deaths
Italian male film actors
Italian male stage actors
Actors from Venice